Patrick Quinn may refer to:
 Patrick Quinn (actor) (1950–2006), American actor
 Patrick Quinn (priest) (fl. 1600s), Irish Roman Catholic priest
 Patrick Quinn (Metropolitan Police officer) (1855–1936), Irish police officer
 Patrick Quinn (Australian politician) (1862–1926), Australian politician
 Patrick Quinn (athlete) (1885–1946), British track and field athlete
 C. Patrick Quinn (1900–?), Member of the Michigan House of Representatives
 Patrick Quinn (Garda) (1904–1976), Irish police officer
 Patrick Quinn (Irish republican) (born 1962), member of the Irish Republican Army
 Patrick Quinn (ALS activist) (1983–2020), American activist

See also
Paddy Quinn (disambiguation)
Pat Quinn (disambiguation)
Patricia Quinn (disambiguation)